is a Japanese artist, designer, and musician. Primarily known for the design of sound-based objects, Suzuki is a partner of the London office of Pentagram.

Early life and education
Yuri Suzuki was born in 1980 in Tokyo, Japan and grew up in Shibuya ward. While at Wako Gakuen High School, he became a fan of the product design artist collective Maywa Denki and started making replicas of their music instruments. Maywa Denki soon noticed Suzuki’s activity and in 1999 made him an assistant. He continued working and performing as a part of the collective throughout his BA Product Design studies at Nihon University. In 2005, Suzuki moved to London and to study in the MA Design Products program at the Royal College of Art.

Career
After completing his graduate education, Suzuki started to work on his sound installations and experimental product designs as well as participating in artist-in-residence programmes in Japan, UK and India.

Alongside his activities as an artist and designer, Suzuki also worked for Teenage Engineering in Stockholm and Research Department of Disney in California, and fully relocated back to London in 2012. In 2013, Suzuki launched Ototo, a circuit board that turns any conductive materials into a music instrument.

As media coverage on Suzuki's work grew, collaborations with musicians have begun as well. Suzuki designed and produced musical instruments for will.i.am and Jeff Mills, and organized a workshop-based music video brief with Damian Kulash from OK Go.

Suzuki taught at the Royal College of Art and School of Architecture Interactive Architecture Lab, University College London as a visiting tutor, gave lectures and held workshops at numerous art colleges in Europe. In November 2018, Suzuki joined the London office of Pentagram as a partner.

September 2020 saw Suzuki launch the experimental music label MSG with the inaugural release Scott’s Dream – Music From A Reimagined Digital Electronium paying tribute to the work of Raymond Scott.

Exhibitions
2014: solo exhibition at Pola Museum Annex, Tokyo.
2019: retrospective exhibition  titled Sound in Mind: Yuri Suzuki at London's Design Museum

Collections
Museum of Modern Art, New York
Art Institute of Chicago

Recognition and awards 
 Designer of the Future Award Design Miami /Swarovski (2016)
 Honorary mention (Sound Art) Prix Ars Electronica (2016)
 Honorary mention (Interactive Art) Prix Ars Electronica (2016)
 Designers in Residence Design Museum, London (2012)
 Honorary mention (Interactive Art) Prix Ars Electronica (2009)

References

External links 
Official site

Living people
1980 births
Artists from Tokyo
Japanese designers
Experimental musicians
Pentagram partners (past and present)